Konstantin Romanov  may refer to:

 Konstantin Romanov (ice hockey) (born 1985), Kazakh professional ice hockey player
 Grand Duke Constantine Pavlovich of Russia (1779–1831), second son of the Russian Emperor Paul I
 Grand Duke Konstantin Nikolayevich of Russia (1827–1892), second son of the Russian Emperor Nicholas I
 Grand Duke Konstantin Konstantinovich of Russia (1858–1915), second son of the above Grand Duke Constantine Nicolaievich
 Prince Constantine Constantinovich of Russia (1891–1918), son of the above Grand Duke Constantine Constantinovich